(also known as ) is the main railway station in Tunis, the capital of Tunisia.

The station was damaged in a fire, during the revolution of 2011.

References 

Railway stations in Tunisia
Buildings and structures in Tunis